Xue is the pinyin romanization of the Chinese surname 薛 (Xuē). It is romanized as Hsüeh in Wade-Giles. In Hong Kong and Macau it is usually romanized through its Cantonese pronunciation Sit. In Korean, it corresponds to Seol (설), in Japanese to Setsu and in Vietnamese to Tiết. in Indonesia and Netherlands, it is commonly spelled as Siek. According to the 2010 Chinese Census, it is the 76th most common surname in China, a sharp decline from 48th in 1982. In a study by geneticist Yuan Yida on the distribution of Chinese surnames, people who carry the name Xue are dispersed throughout the country and is most heavily concentrated in Shanxi. It is the 68th name on the Hundred Family Surnames poem.

Origin
The surname traces back to the State of Xue in what is modern day Shandong. Yu the Great, founding emperor of the Xia dynasty, bestowed upon his minister Xi Zhong the title Marquis of Xue in gratitude for his invention of the Chinese chariot; Xi Zhong's descendants subsequently bore Xue as their clan name.

Sinicized descendants of various non-Han Chinese peoples also adopted Xue as their surname, including the Turkic Tiele Xueyantuo tribe, the Xianbei Chigan clan and several Manchu clans such as Sakda Hala, Sue Hala, Sunit Hala etc.

In literature
In the classical novel Dream of the Red Chamber by Cao Xueqin, the Xue family is one of the four noble families of Jinling. The socially graceful debutante Xue Baochai, a literary embodiment of ideal traditional Chinese femininity,  is one of the principal characters in the novel.

Notable people with this surname (薛)

Academics and science
 Xue Juzheng, Song Dynasty historian and scholar
 Xue Muqiao, Chinese economist

Arts, media and entertainment
 Xue Fei, former China Central Television news anchor
 Xue Ji, Tang dynasty calligrapher
 Nancy Sit Ka Yin, Hong Kong actress
 Xue Jiye, Chinese painter and sculptor
 Xue Jinghua, the prima ballerina of the ballet Red Detachment of Women
 Fiona Sit Hoi Kei, Hong Kong actress/singer
 Xue Tao, Tang dynasty poet
 Xue Xiaolu, Chinese director and screenwriter
 Xue Xinran, British-Chinese broadcaster, journalist and author
 Xue Yongjun, Chinese artist
 Xue Zhi Qian (Joker Xue), Chinese Singer and actor
 Francis Hsueh and Steven Hahn, film-making duo
 Amy Sit Ying Yi, Hong Kong actress

Athletics
 Xue Bing, Chinese canoe sprinter
 Xue Changrui, Chinese pole vaulter, Asian Champion 2013
 Xue Chen, Chinese professional beach volleyball player
 Xue Haifeng, archer who competed in the 2004 and 2008 Summer Olympics
 Xue Juan, Chinese javelin thrower
 Xue Ming, Chinese volleyball player
 Xue Ya'nan, Chinese footballer
 Xue Yuyang, Chinese basketball player

Business
 Xue Manzi (Charles Xue), Chinese American entrepreneur, son of Xue Zizheng
 ShaoLan Hsueh, entrepreneur born in Taiwan who developed a new method to teach Chinese characters.
 Albino SyCip (Xue Minlao), co-founder of Filipino bank, Chinabank
 Alfonso SyCip (Xue Fenshi) Chairman, Philippine Chinese General Chamber of Commerce, 1934–41.

Criminals
 Sek Kim Wah (1964–1988), Singaporean convicted serial killer who was sentenced to death for five murders in Singapore
 Seet Cher Hng, Singaporean convicted murderer who killed his wife in 2018

Government, politics, law and military
 Hsueh Hsiang-chuan (1944-), politician in Taiwan
 Hsueh Jui-yuan, Vice Minister of Health and Welfare 
 Hsueh Ling (1954-), member of the Democratic Progressive Party, in Taiwan
 Xue Daoheng, official in Northern Qi, Northern Zhou and Sui dynasty
 Xue E, Tang dynasty general, grandson of Xue Rengui
 Xue Feng, American geologist held in China on espionage charges
 Xue Fucheng, Qing dynasty diplomat
 Xue Hanqin, judge at International Court of Justice
 Xue Ji, Tang dynasty chancellor, great-grandson of Xue Daoheng
 Xue Ju, founding emperor of a short-lived state of Qin at the end of the Sui dynasty
 Xue Ping, Tang dynasty general, son of Xue Song
 Hsueh Chi, Taiwanese economist and politician
 Xue Ne, early Tang dynasty general, son of Xue Rengui,
 Xue Rengao, emperor of the short-lived state of Qin before surrendering to the founder of the Tang dynasty, Emperor Taizong of Tang
 Xue Rengui, early Tang dynasty general, most known for his campaigns against Goguryeo, the Western Turkic Khaganate, and the Tibetan Empire
 Xue Song, Tang dynasty general, grandson of Xue Rengui
 Xue Wanche, early Tang dynasty general
 Xue Wenjie, Min official
 Xue Xu, Eastern Wu official, son of Xue Zong
 Xue Yiju, Tang dynasty and Later Liang dynasty chancellor
 Xue Ying, Eastern Wu official, son of Xue Zong
 Xue Yuanchao, Tang dynasty chancellor
 Xue Yue, Kuomintang army general during the Second Sino-Japanese War and the Chinese Civil War
 Xue Zizheng, former Deputy Head of the United Front Work Department
 Xue Zong, Minister of State of Eastern Wu during the Three Kingdoms
 Alfred Sit Wing Hang, former Secretary for Innovation and Technology in Hong Kong
Kingsley Sit Ho Yin, Member of the Legislative Council of Hong Kong.

Fiction
 Xue Baochai, one of the protagonists of the classic Chinese novel Dream of the Red Chamber

Notes

References

Chinese-language surnames
Individual Chinese surnames